The 2000–01 season is Hyderabad cricket team's 67th competitive season. The Hyderabad cricket team is senior men's domestic cricket team based in the city of Hyderabad, India, run by the Hyderabad Cricket Association. They represent the region of Telangana in the state of Andhra Pradesh in domestic competitions.

Squad
The following players made at least one appearance for Hyderabad in first-class, List A or Twenty20 cricket in 2019–20 season.  Age given is at the start of Hyderabad's first match of the season (1 November 2000).
Players with international caps are listed in bold.

Competitions

Overview

Ranji Trophy

The Hyderabad team, led by V. V. S. Laxman, began their campaign in the Ranji Trophy, the premier first-class cricket tournament in India, with a draw against the Karnataka at Bangalore on 1 November 2000. Though Mohammad Azharuddin got selected for the tournament, he did not play a single match owing to the match fixing allegations which he confessed on 2 November 2000. Azharuddin was later banned for life by the Board of Control for Cricket in India on 5 December 2000. Despite losing Azharuddin, the Hyderabad still managed to finish inside top-3 in the South Zone and advance to the knockout stage with two wins and three draws. With the absence of their main players due to various reasons for the knockout stage, the Hyderabad were eliminated in the pre-quarterfinal where the Madhya Pradesh defeated Hyderabad through first innings lead.

Points Table
South Zone

  Top three teams advanced to the knockout stage.
 Points system : Win = 8, Draw with first innings lead = 5, No Result = 3, Draw with first innings deficit = 3, Loss = 0.

Knockout stage

Matches
Zonal Stage

Pre–quarterfinal

Ranji One–Day Trophy
The Hyderabad team, led by V. V. S. Laxman, began their campaign in the Subbaiah Pillai Trophy as part of the South Zone Ranji One–Day Trophy, a List-A cricket tournament in India, with a win against the Andhra at Chennai on 5 December 2000. In a rain-hit reduced over match, the half-century from Amit Pathak helped the Andhra post 150 in 25 overs but the half-century from Daniel Manohar along with the support from Laxman with his 43 off 47 balls ensured the seven-wicket win for the Hyderabad. In the second match, the four-wicket haul from Venkatapathy Raju and an unbeaten half-century from Nand Kishore helped the Hyderabad defeat the Karnataka by eight wickets. The Hyderabad got their third win of the tournament in as many matches as Mohammad Ghouse Baba's all-round effort consisting of 20 off eight balls and bowling figures of 1/29 in ten overs helped the Hyderabad defeat the Kerala by 64 runs. The Hyderabad also got the support through the half-centuries from Manohar, Vanka Pratap and Devishetty Vinay Kumar in the batting and the three-wicket haul from Raju in the bowling. The Hyderabad suffered their first loss in this tournament when the Tamil Nadu chased their target in the last ball with three-wickets to spare. Earlier, the Hyderabad posted 256 in 50 overs with the century from Pratap while the Tamil Nadu suffered for their slow-over rate as their chase was reduced to 47 overs. The Tamil Nadu started the chase with the half-centuries from Sadagoppan Ramesh and Jayaraman Madanagopal while the brisk scoring from Robin Singh helped them in the end after their middle-order collapse. The defeat against the Tamil Nadu hurt the Hyderabad in their final zonal match as their batting collapsed while trying to quickly chase the target of 235 set by the Goa to improve their chances of qualifying for the Wills Trophy. Earlier, the three-wicket haul from Narender Pal Singh helped the Hyderabad restrict the Goa to 235 despite the half-century from Tanveer Jabbar. On realizing that Tamil Nadu was about to have a big win in their final zonal match, the Hyderabad started chasing the target in quick pace with Laxman and Manohar adding 125 runs in just 12 overs but their batting order collapsed in the middle when the both set batsmen were dismissed as the Goa emerged as the victorious in the end by two runs. This loss resulted in the Hyderabad finishing third in the South Zone with three wins and two losses as they failed to qualify for the Wills Trophy.

Points Table
South Zone

  Top team qualified for the 2001–02 Wills Trophy.
 Points system : Win = 2, Tie/No Result = 1, Loss = 0.

Matches
Zonal Stage

Player statistics

Batting and Fielding

Bowling

See also
 Hyderabad cricket team
 Hyderabad Cricket Association

Notes

Footnotes

References

External links
Hyderabad cricket team official site

Cricket in Hyderabad, India
Cricket in Telangana
Sport in Telangana